Sylfest Glimsdal (born 9 October 1966) is a former Norwegian biathlete. In the 1991–92 season, Glimsdal came third in the overall World Cup standings, behind Jon Åge Tyldum and Mikael Löfgren.  During his career he won one gold, one silver and one bronze medal at World Championships. In 2000, he ended his career as a biathlete.

Biathlon results
All results are sourced from the International Biathlon Union.

Olympic Games

World Championships
3 medals (1 gold, 1 silver, 1 bronze)

*During Olympic seasons competitions are only held for those events not included in the Olympic program.
**Team was removed as an event in 1998, and pursuit was added in 1997 with mass start being added in 1999.

Individual victories
3 victories (1 In, 2 Sp)

*Results are from UIPMB and IBU races which include the Biathlon World Cup, Biathlon World Championships and the Winter Olympic Games.

References

External links
 
 

1966 births
Living people
People from Nord-Aurdal
Norwegian male biathletes
Biathletes at the 1988 Winter Olympics
Biathletes at the 1992 Winter Olympics
Biathletes at the 1994 Winter Olympics
Olympic biathletes of Norway
Biathlon World Championships medalists
Sportspeople from Innlandet